Grand Hotel Tijuana, otherwise known as Las Torres, is a high-rise complex of twin skyscrapers in Tijuana, Mexico. 

Las Torres may also refer to:

 Las Torres de Cotillas, a municipality in Murcia, Spain
 Las Torres metro station, in Santiago, Chile
 Las Torres (Mexibús, Line 1), a BRT station in Ecatepec, State of Mexico
 Las Torres (Mexibús, Line 3), a BRT station in Nezahualcóyotl, State of Mexico
 Las Torres (Xochimilco Light Rail), a light rail station in Mexico City
 Las Torres, a Medellín Metro station

See also 
 Torres (disambiguation)